Rabbit Habits is the third album by experimental rock group Man Man. The album incorporates raspy vocals, jangly guitars, synths, bells, acoustic guitar, and, as heard on "Mysteries of the Universe Unraveled" and "Doo Right", fireworks.

Honus Honus described his change in vocal approach for the album:"[On] the first two Man Man records I didn’t know how to sing at all. I didn’t think there would be more than one or two records, so all the songs I wrote on those albums are just pipe shredders, so it destroyed my range and those songs are the hardest to sing as I got older with a band, you know? Your body starts to figure out how not to do it so the songs from, like, Rabbit Habits-on are just more catered to not destroying your voice."

Track listing
"Mister Jung Stuffed" – 2:28
"Hurly / Burly" – 3:51
"The Ballad of Butter Beans" – 4:28
"Big Trouble" – 5:05
"Mysteries of the Universe Unraveled" – 0:09
"Doo Right" – 1:38
"Easy Eats or Dirty Doctor Galapagos" – 2:24
"Harpoon Fever (Queequeg's Playhouse)" – 3:19
"El Azteca" – 1:43
"Rabbit Habits" – 2:48
"Top Drawer" – 3:26
"Poor Jackie" – 8:23
"Whalebones" – 7:14

References

2008 albums
Man Man albums
Anti- (record label) albums